Sindechites  is a genus of flowering plants in the family Apocynaceae, first described as a genus in 1888. It is native to southern China, Laos, and Thailand.

Species
 Sindechites chinensis (Merr.) Markgr. & Tsiang - Hainan, Laos, Thailand
 Sindechites henryi Oliv. - Guangxi, Guizhou, Hubei, Hunan, Jiangxi, Sichuan, Yunnan, Zhejiang

References

 
Apocynaceae genera
Taxa named by Daniel Oliver